{{DISPLAYTITLE:C13H16N2O}}
The molecular formula C13H16N2O (molar mass : 216.27 g/mol) may refer to :

 AZD0328
 Cirazoline
 Dianicline
 Efaroxan
 6-MeO-THH
 Oxantel
 Proxyfan
 Tetrahydroharmine